The resource fragmentation hypothesis was first proposed by Janzen & Pond (1975), and says that as species richness becomes large there is not a linear increase in the number of parasitoid species that can be supported.  The mechanism for this hyperbolic relationship is suggested to be that each of the new host species are too rare to support the evolution of specialist parasitoids (Janzen & Pond, 1975).  The resource fragmentation hypothesis is one of two hypotheses that seek to explain the distribution of the Ichneumonidae.

References
Janzen, D.H. & Pond, C.M. (1975) A comparison by sweep sampling of the arthropod fauna of secondary vegetation in Michigan, England, and Costa Rica. Transactions of the Royal Entomological Society of London, 127, 33-50.

Further reading
Gauld, I., Gaston, K., & Janzen, D. (1992) Plant allelochemicals, tritrophic interactions and the anomalous diversity of tropical parasitoids: the “nasty” host hypothesis. Oikos, 65, 353-357.

Zoology